Nuvvante Naakishtam is a 2005 Telugu-language romance film written, produced and directed by E. V. V. Satyanarayana. The film stars Aryan Rajesh, Anu Mehta, Allari Naresh, Rama Prabha, and Suman.  In July 2005, with inclusion of Satyanarayana's sons Rajesh and Naresh, the film was reported as almost ready. The movie is a remake of 2003 Kannada movie Neenandre Ishta starring Darshan.

Plot
When wealthy NRI Yuvaraj (Aryan Rajesh) comes to a village seeking a bride for himself, he finds a suitable choice in Radha (Anuradha Mehta). But it develops that she is in love with Devudu (Allari Naresh), a man thought to be dead. This is because of her father who doesn't want his daughter to marry a poor guy. He sends Devudu for earning money with the inherent idea of getting rid of him in the city. Devudu survives and leaves Singapore in a ship for earning money.  When Devudu returns, the questions arise, why was he thought to be dead, and was it because somebody wished him out of their way?

Cast

 Aryan Rajesh as Yuvaraj
 Allari Naresh as Devudu
 Anu Mehta as Radha 
 L.B. Sriram as Bindela Babu Rao
 Ali
 Krishna Bhagavan
 Nakuul Mehta
 Bhuvaneswari
 Chalapathi Rao
 Chandra Mohan
 Hema
 Kondavalasa Lakshmana Rao
 Chittajalu Lakshmipati
 Mallikharjuna Rao
 M.S. Narayana
 Satyam Rajesh
 Rama Prabha
 Sangeetha
 A.V.S. Subramanyam
 Suman
 Tulasi
 Gajala (Cameo)

Soundtrack

Music composed by Koti and released on Aditya Music.

Reception
Indian Movies found that as a confused Non-resident Indian seeking a wife Aryan Rajesh was okay but it was Allari Naresh as Anu Mehta's love Devudu, returned from presumed death, who "steals the show".  They concluded that Anu's Radha "doesn't have much to do".

References

External links
 Nuvvante Naakistam at the Internet Movie Database

2007 films
2000s Telugu-language films
Films directed by E. V. V. Satyanarayana
Films scored by Koti
Telugu remakes of Kannada films